North Vancouver was a provincial electoral district in the Canadian province of British Columbia.  It first appeared on the hustings in 1916 and at the time of its creation included West Vancouver as well as North Vancouver.  Prior to its creation the North Shore had been part of the Vancouver riding..

The North Vancouver riding last appeared in the election of 1963, after which it was partitioned into North Vancouver-Capilano, North Vancouver-Seymour, and West Vancouver-Howe Sound.  This area is represented today by North Vancouver-Seymour and North Vancouver-Lonsdale.  The Lonsdale riding covers an area similar to North Vancouver-Capilano.  West Vancouver-Howe Sound has become West Vancouver-Capilano and West Vancouver-Garibaldi.  The latter includes areas formerly part of the old Lillooet riding  West Vancouver-Capilano includes western areas of North Vancouver formerly part of North Vancouver-Capilano.

For other current and historical North Shore and City of Vancouver ridings, please see Vancouver (electoral districts)

Demographics

Geography

History

Notable MLAs

Election results 

|Liberal
|George Samuel Hanes
|align="right"|980 		
|align="right"|52.80%
|align="right"|
|align="right"|unknown
 
|Conservative
|George H. Morden
|align="right"|598 	
|align="right"|32.22%
|align="right"|
|align="right"|unknown

|- bgcolor="white"
!align="right" colspan=3|Total valid votes
!align="right"|1,856  
!align="right"|100.00%
!align="right"|
|- bgcolor="white"
!align="right" colspan=3|Total rejected ballots
!align="right"|
!align="right"|
!align="right"|
|- bgcolor="white"
!align="right" colspan=3|Turnout
!align="right"|%
!align="right"|
!align="right"|
|}

|Independent 
|George Samuel Hanes 1
|align="right"|2,681 	 	
|align="right"|54.68%
|align="right"|
|align="right"|unknown
 
|Conservative
|Valient Vivian Vinson 
|align="right"|1,180 	 	
|align="right"|24.07%
|align="right"|
|align="right"|unknown

|Liberal
|Benjamin Chubb 2
|align="right"|913 	 	
|align="right"|18.62%
|align="right"|
|align="right"|unknown

|Independents
|James Orchard
|align="right"|129 		
|align="right"|2.63%
|align="right"|
|align="right"|unknown
|- bgcolor="white"
!align="right" colspan=3|Total valid votes
!align="right"|4,903 	
!align="right"|100.00%
!align="right"|
|- bgcolor="white"
!align="right" colspan=3|Total rejected ballots
!align="right"|
!align="right"|
!align="right"|
|- bgcolor="white"
!align="right" colspan=3|Turnout
!align="right"|%
!align="right"|
!align="right"|
|- bgcolor="white"
!align="right" colspan=7|1  Endorsed by North Vancouver City Liberal Association and by Great War Veterans Association. 
|- bgcolor="white"
!align="right" colspan=7|2  Repudiated by North Vancouver City Liberal Association..
|- bgcolor="white"
|}

 
|Liberal
|John Melvin Bryan Sr.
|align="right"|1,283 	
|align="right"|31.34%

 
|Conservative
|William Stearne Deacon
|align="right"|442 	 	
|align="right"|10.80%

|Independent
|James Orchard
|align="right"|55 	 	 	
|align="right"|1.34%
|- bgcolor="white"
!align="right" colspan=3|Total valid votes
!align="right"|4,094  
!align="right"|100.00%
|}

 
|Liberal
|Ian Alistair MacKenzie
|align="right"|2,498 	 	
|align="right"|46.60%
|align="right"|
|align="right"|unknown
 
|Conservative
|Jack Loutet
|align="right"|2,466 	 	
|align="right"|46.00%
|align="right"|
|align="right"|unknown

|Independent
|Archie Carland MacMillan
|align="right"|397 	 	 	
|align="right"|7.40%
|align="right"|
|align="right"|unknown
|- bgcolor="white"
!align="right" colspan=3|Total valid votes
!align="right"|5,361 
!align="right"|100.00%
!align="right"|
|- bgcolor="white"
!align="right" colspan=3|Total rejected ballots
!align="right"|118
!align="right"|
!align="right"|
|- bgcolor="white"
!align="right" colspan=3|Turnout
!align="right"|%
!align="right"|
!align="right"|
|}

 
|Co-operative Commonwealth Fed.
|Harley Christian Erskine Anderson
|align="right"|2,427 		 	
|align="right"|35.19%

 
|Liberal
|Herbert Spencer Wood
|align="right"|1,636 	 	 	 	
|align="right"|23.72%

 
|Labour (Party) 3
|Howard Edward Ryan
|align="right"|65 		 	
|align="right"|0.94%

|Independent
|James Whitham
|align="right"|7 		 	
|align="right"|0.10%
|- bgcolor="white"
!align="right" colspan=3|Total valid votes
!align="right"|6,897 
!align="right"|100.00%
|- bgcolor="white"
!align="right" colspan=3|Total rejected ballots
!align="right"|77
!align="right"|
|- bgcolor="white"
!align="right" colspan=7|3  Endorsed by the Independent CCF.
|}

 
|Co-operative Commonwealth Fed.
|Dorothy Steeves
|align="right"|2,749 	 		 	
|align="right"|32.23%
|align="right"|
|align="right"|unknown

|Independent 
|Joseph Bentley Leyland
|align="right"|2,386 	 	
|align="right"|27.98%
|align="right"|
|align="right"|unknown
 
|Liberal
|Edith Myrtle Turner
|align="right"|1,847 	
|align="right"|21.66%
|align="right"|
|align="right"|unknown
 
|Conservative
|Jack Loutet
|align="right"|1,522
|align="right"|17.84%
|align="right"|
|align="right"|unknown

|Independent
|James Whitham
|align="right"|25 	 		 	
|align="right"|0.29%
|align="right"|
|align="right"|unknown
|- bgcolor="white"
!align="right" colspan=3|Total valid votes
!align="right"|8,529
!align="right"|100.00%
!align="right"|
|- bgcolor="white"
!align="right" colspan=3|Total rejected ballots
!align="right"|94
!align="right"|
!align="right"|
|- bgcolor="white"
!align="right" colspan=3|Turnout
!align="right"|%
!align="right"|
!align="right"|
|- bgcolor="white"
!align="right" colspan=7|
|}

 
|Co-operative Commonwealth Fed.
|Dorothy Steeves
|align="right"|4,209 		 		 	
|align="right"|40.37%
|align="right"|
|align="right"|unknown
 
|Liberal
|Francis Austin Walker
|align="right"|2,945 	
|align="right"|28.24%
|align="right"|
|align="right"|unknown
 
|Official Conservative 1
|Alfred Hugh Bayne
|align="right"|2,161 		 	
|align="right"|20.73%
|align="right"|
|align="right"|unknown
 
|Conservative
|Joshua Hinchcliffe 1
|align="right"|1,056 	
|align="right"|10.13%
|align="right"|
|align="right"|unknown

|- bgcolor="white"
!align="right" colspan=3|Total valid votes
!align="right"|10,427 	
!align="right"|100.00%
!align="right"|
|- bgcolor="white"
!align="right" colspan=3|Total rejected ballots
!align="right"|162
!align="right"|
!align="right"|
|- bgcolor="white"
!align="right" colspan=3|Turnout
!align="right"|%
!align="right"|
!align="right"|
|- bgcolor="white"
!align="right" colspan=7|1  J. Hinchliffe was nominated by the North Vancouver Conservative Association but when he disagreed with the party's road policy he was repudiated by the party leader, R.L. Maitland. A group called the Conservative Active Club nominated A. H. Bayne who was approved by Maitland. Bayne, however, could not run as a Conservative since Hinchliffe's nomination papers had been filed. Consequently, Hinchliffe's votes are included in the Conservative Party total and Bayne, who ran as an "Official Conservative", is listed separately.
|}

 
|Co-operative Commonwealth Fed.
|Dorothy Steeves
|align="right"|4,070 		 		 	
|align="right"|37.31%
|align="right"|
|align="right"|unknown

 
|Social Credit Alliance
|Stanley Earl Wilcox
|align="right"|280 	
|align="right"|2.57%
|align="right"|
|align="right"|unknown

|- bgcolor="white"
!align="right" colspan=3|Total valid votes
!align="right"|10,908 	
!align="right"|100.00%
!align="right"|
|- bgcolor="white"
!align="right" colspan=3|Total rejected ballots
!align="right"|205
!align="right"|
!align="right"|
|- bgcolor="white"
!align="right" colspan=3|Turnout
!align="right"|%
!align="right"|
!align="right"|
|- bgcolor="white"
!align="right" colspan=7|1  John Hendry Cates in List of Candidates.
|}

 
|Co-operative Commonwealth Fed.
|Clifford Augustine Greer
|align="right"|5,504 			 		 	
|align="right"|30.43%
|align="right"|
|align="right"|unknown
|- bgcolor="white"
!align="right" colspan=3|Total valid votes
!align="right"|18,090 		
!align="right"|100.00%
!align="right"|
|- bgcolor="white"
!align="right" colspan=3|Total rejected ballots
!align="right"|220
!align="right"|
!align="right"|
|- bgcolor="white"
!align="right" colspan=3|Turnout
!align="right"|
!align="right"|
!align="right"|
|}

|align="right"|
|align="right"|unknown
 
|Co-operative Commonwealth Fed.
|Dorothy Steeves
|align="right"|6,268         			 		 	
|align="right"|27.50%
|align="right"|8,980
|align="right"|46.60%
|align="right"|
|align="right"|unknown

 
|Progressive Conservative
|Arthur Archibald McArthur
|align="right"|4,061   	 	 		 	
|align="right"|17.82%
|align="right"| 
|align="right"| 
|align="right"|
|align="right"|unknown
 

|Independent
|John Howard Fletcher
|align="right"|216   			 		 	
|align="right"|0.95%
|align="right"| 
|align="right"|
|align="right"|
|align="right"|unknown
|- bgcolor="white"
!align="right" colspan=3|Total valid votes
!align="right"|22,791  		
!align="right"|100.00%
!align="right"|19,272 	
|align="right"| -.- %
|align="right"|
|- bgcolor="white"
!align="right" colspan=3|Total rejected ballots
!align="right"|571
!align="right"|
!align="right"|
|align="right"|
|align="right"|unknown
|- bgcolor="white"
!align="right" colspan=3|Turnout
!align="right"|
!align="right"|
!align="right"|
!align="right"|
|- bgcolor="white"
!align="right" colspan=9|1  Preferential ballot.  First and final counts (of 6) shown only.
|}

|align="right"|
|align="right"|unknown
 
|Co-operative Commonwealth Fed.
|Dorothy Steeves
|align="right"|5,820 	        			 		 	
|align="right"|26.87%
|align="right"| 
|align="right"|
|align="right"|
|align="right"|unknown
 
|Progressive Conservative
|Rodney Beavan
|align="right"|1,338 	 	 	 		 	
|align="right"|6.18%
|align="right"| 
|align="right"| 
|align="right"| 
|align="right"|unknown

|- bgcolor="white"
!align="right" colspan=3|Total valid votes
!align="right"|21,662 	  	 	
!align="right"|100.00%
!align="right"|18,425
|align="right"| 
|align="right"|
|- bgcolor="white"
!align="right" colspan=3|Total rejected ballots
!align="right"|1,108
!align="right"|
!align="right"|
|align="right"|
|align="right"|unknown
|- bgcolor="white"
!align="right" colspan=3|Turnout
!align="right"|
!align="right"|
!align="right"|
!align="right"|
|- bgcolor="white"
!align="right" colspan=9|1  Preferential ballot.  First and final counts (of 5) shown only.
|}

 
|Progressive Conservative
|Douglas Deane Finlayson
|align="right"|5,121 		 	  	 		 	
|align="right"|9.53%
|align="right"|
|align="right"|unknown
 
|Co-operative Commonwealth Fed.
|John Edward Beltz
|align="right"|4,718 	 	        			 		 	
|align="right"|7.78%
|align="right"|
|align="right"|unknown
 
|Co-operative Commonwealth Fed.
|George Collis
|align="right"|4,266 	 	 		 	 		 	
|align="right"|7.94%
|align="right"| 
|align="right"|unknown
 
|Independent (SC) 2
|George Henry Tomlinson Jr.
|align="right"|902 	 		   			 		 	
|align="right"|1.68%
|align="right"|
|align="right"|unknown
 
|Independent (SC) 2
|Stanley Earl Wilcox
|align="right"|227 	 	 		   			 		 
|align="right"|0.42%
|align="right"|
|align="right"|unknown

|- bgcolor="white"
!align="right" colspan=3|Total valid votes
!align="right"|53,719 	  	 	
!align="right"|100.00%
|align="right"|
|align="right"|unknown
|- bgcolor="white"
!align="right" colspan=3|Total rejected ballots
!align="right"|346
!align="right"|
|align="right"|unknown
|- bgcolor="white"
!align="right" colspan=3|Turnout
!align="right"|
!align="right"|
!align="right"|
|- bgcolor="white"
!align="right" colspan=7|1  Seat increased to two members from one.
|- bgcolor="white"
!align="right" colspan=7|2  Under the Election Act (SBC 1940 c.20 s.28) Independent candidates could not use "the name of a recognized political party."
|}

 
|Co-operative Commonwealth Fed.
|Orville Garfield Braaten
|align="right"|6,746 	 	 	        			 		 
|align="right"|9.33%
|align="right"|
|align="right"|unknown
 
|Co-operative Commonwealth Fed.
|Hugh Clifford
|align="right"|6,720 	 	 	        			 		 
|align="right"|9.29%
|align="right"|
|align="right"|unknown
 
|Progressive Conservative
|Douglas Deane Finlayson
|align="right"|3,260 		 	  	 		 	
|align="right"|4.51%
|align="right"|
|align="right"|unknown
 
|Progressive Conservative
|Robert Read Maitland
|align="right"|2,397 		 	  	 		 	
|align="right"|3.31%
|align="right"|
|align="right"|unknown

|- bgcolor="white"
!align="right" colspan=3|Total valid votes
!align="right"|72,331 	  	 	
!align="right"|100.00%
|align="right"|
|align="right"|unknown
|- bgcolor="white"
!align="right" colspan=3|Total rejected ballots
!align="right"|438
!align="right"|
|align="right"|unknown
|- bgcolor="white"
!align="right" colspan=3|Turnout
!align="right"|
!align="right"|
!align="right"|
|}

 
|New Democrat
|Peter Samuel Farinow
|align="right"|5,764 	 	 	 	        			 	
|align="right"|7.86%
|align="right"|
|align="right"|unknown
 
|New Democrat
|Hugh Clifford
|align="right"|5,409 	 	 	 	        			 	
|align="right"|7.38%
|align="right"|
|align="right"|unknown
 
|Progressive Conservative
|John Patrick Nowlan
|align="right"|3,567 	 		 	  	 		 	
|align="right"|4.86%
|align="right"|
|align="right"|unknown
 
|Progressive Conservative
|Ronald Clifton Bray
|align="right"|3,088 	 		 	  	 		 	
|align="right"|4.21%
|align="right"|
|align="right"|unknown

|- bgcolor="white"
!align="right" colspan=3|Total valid votes
!align="right"|73,337   	 	
!align="right"|100.00%
|align="right"|
|align="right"|unknown
|- bgcolor="white"
!align="right" colspan=3|Total rejected ballots
!align="right"|332
!align="right"|
|align="right"|unknown
|- bgcolor="white"
!align="right" colspan=3|Turnout
!align="right"|
!align="right"|
!align="right"|
|}  	  	

Following the 1963 election North Vancouver was redistributed into three one-member seats:
 North Vancouver-Capilano
 North Vancouver-Seymour (current riding)
 West Vancouver-Howe Sound

Former provincial electoral districts of British Columbia
North Vancouver (district municipality)
North Vancouver (city)
West Vancouver